Trinidad and Tobago competed at the 2014 Summer Youth Olympics, in Nanjing, China from 16 August to 28 August 2014.

Athletics

Trinidad and Tobago qualified five athletes.

Qualification Legend: Q=Final A (medal); qB=Final B (non-medal); qC=Final C (non-medal); qD=Final D (non-medal); qE=Final E (non-medal)

Boys
Track & road events

Field Events

Girls
Track & road events

Field events

Beach Volleyball

Trinidad and Tobago qualified a girls' team by winning the NORCECA CAZOVA Zone Qualifier.

Sailing

Trinidad and Tobago qualified one boat based on its performance at the Byte CII North American & Caribbean Continental Qualifiers.

Swimming

Trinidad and Tobago qualified three swimmers.

Boys

Girls

References

2014 in Trinidad and Tobago sport
Nations at the 2014 Summer Youth Olympics
Trinidad and Tobago at the Youth Olympics